is a Japanese manga series written and illustrated by Minoru Toyoda. It began serialization in 2003 in Kodansha's Monthly Afternoon. The first bound volume was released in September 2003 in Japan; as of December 2005, the story concluded with five volumes released. The manga was licensed by Del Rey, with the first volume being released on August 30, 2005.
The story is about a boy, Hoshino, who to attract the girl he likes, Negishi, chooses to be completely honest.

Plot
In the middle of class, in front of everybody, Hoshino approaches Negishi (who doesn't even know his name) with "Negishi, I like you. Please go out with me" and is obviously refused; she refuses to go on a date too, so they settle for walking home together, and the whole class starts laughing and clapping their hands (a leitmotiv in their story, marking every significant advancement in their relationship). The day after their walk, Negishi approaches Hoshino with "Hoshino, I like you. Please go out with me."

Characters
 
 Undoubtedly an honest guy who always says what he thinks. He loved Negishi since the first moment he saw her, because she was saying and doing what he too had in his heart, but he didn't have the courage to act upon according to his feelings; from that moment on, he decided he'd always be honest.

 
 The girl Hoshino loves; she has more common sense than he does, and thus she often slaps or punches him out of embarrassment. She gets a little embarrassed when Hoshino's and her relationship is often put on display to the high school public. Negishi is a horrible cook who can barely make any edible food for anyone including Hoshino. She thinks that she is like the tsukkomi in a Manzai, where Hoshino is the boke; in a panel, though, Hoshino claims to be the tsukkomi.

 
 Negishi's best friend (Hoshino at first calls her "Negishi's friend" and never uses her name), intriguing and scheming; she often thinks of absurd plans for Hoshino, and is the primary source of comedy in the story. Although her pranks often make their relationship more difficult, she really roots for them, and accepts going on a double date with Tsukahara, leaving the couple alone as soon as they don't notice.

 She is very often depicted drinking tomato (or other vegetables) juice with a straw, or sucking a lollipop. When the class claps their hands, she is often depicted waving her hand like a music director.

 
 Hoshino's best friend, cool as the author tags him in the character box. Soon after Hoshino's proposal, he gives him a condom, but Hoshino doesn't understand he was teasing him and thanks him deeply. He represents the rational counterpart to Hoshino. Although he generally sees through Yoko's pranks he stays silent, preferring to be the onlooker.

 
 A member of the Occult Research Club, often involved by Yoko in her plans, generally for fortune-telling, as her predictions are always wrong.

 
 A member of Tsukahara's band and Hoshino's classmate; likes dirty talk, and his advice to Hoshino is generally sex-related.

See also
Kongōji-san wa Mendōkusai, another manga series by the same author

References

External links

2003 manga
Del Rey Manga
Kodansha manga
Seinen manga
School life in anime and manga